The Utah Pride Festival is a festival held in downtown Salt Lake City in June celebrating Utah's diversity and gay, lesbian, bisexual, and transgender (LGBT) community. The event is a program of the Utah Pride Center, and includes the state's second-largest parade, after the Days of '47 Parade.

Festivities

The festival includes the parade, a film festival, the Dyke March, members of the Bear Clan, Leathermen, and the Sisters of bondage subcultures, an interfaith service by the Utah Pride Interfaith Coalition, 5K charity run, and related parties and receptions.

Participation in the festival cuts across a broad spectrum of Utahans. Past speakers during the celebration have ranged from Salt Lake City Mayor Rocky Anderson, who was quoted in support of same sex marriage, to Utah Rep. Jackie Biskupski, the state's first openly lesbian legislator (later became Salt Lake City's first openly lesbian mayor).

The festival's last day (Sunday) begins with the parade. Participants have included Mayor Ralph Becker, County Mayor Ben McAdams, a group of uniformed Boy Scouts, the largest group - Mormons Building Bridges, Mormons for Equality, the Provo Pride Council, Westminster College (Utah), and Weber State University. Over 140 organizations, sponsors, and religious groups participate. A large rainbow flag fills the street at the back of the parade.

History

The festival began in 1977 when the Salt Lake Coalition for Human Rights sponsored a three-day conference. Affirmation: LGBTQ Mormons, Families, & Friends (then called Gay Mormons United) was founded during this conference, on June 11. The 1978 keynote speakers were David Kopay, the first NFL player to come out of the closet, and U.S. Air Force Sgt. Leonard Matlovich, an ex-Mormon who was the first openly gay person to appear on the cover of Time magazine.

Utah Pride Inc. was created in 1989 through 2004 as a project of the Gay and Lesbian Community Council of Utah. The project was renamed Pride of Utah in 2006.

The first Pride march in the state was held June 27, 1990 at the state capitol building.  It began on the steps of the capitol, went down Main street, and ended on South Temple at the Utah Museum of Contemporary Art (then the Salt Lake Art Center). It included a procession of 270. In 1991, the Utah Stonewall Center opened and Pride festivities moved to the Salt Lake County Fairgrounds in Murray, Utah. The march attracted twice as many participants along with opposition by members of the Aryan Nation. The Pride Day Art Expo and Competition was created to award local artists with its Lesbian and Gay Pride Art Award and the Mapplethorpe Award.

In 1997, a football field-length pride flag was made to carry down the parade route. It was produced by Rev. Bruce Barton of the Metropolitan Community Church of Salt Lake City, UT along with a dozen helpers (including Bruce Harmon, Jeff Freedman, Carrie Gayler, Lynn Sasaki, Terry Gillman and Garth Snyder) who called it a "tremendous symbol of pride and unity.” Completed the day of the parade (June 8 at 4:15 am), this 300 foot long flag was composed of 35 bolts of lightweight fabric in six colors. It took more than 80 hours to sew. Over 100 marchers would hold the sides. People often threw donations onto the flag, and children would run around underneath. The first flag bearers were members of the Utah Gay and Lesbian Youth group and some others that did not belong to a community organization. They took it from the Utah State Capitol Building, down State Street, past the LDS Church Office Building, and on to the Salt Lake City and County Building. By 2012, the original flag had seen better days, and a new one from Colonial Flag was purchased for $5,000. It is 30x200 feet and made of nylon, with hand holds every 18 inches. Also, Utah Pride Center gifted Moab Pride their own 100 foot flag.

In 2004, an estimated 50,000 people attended, the largest since the festival began. However, in 2005, the first year in which an admission was charged, attendance at the festival was 15,000 to 20,000. Some have attributed this decline to patrons not wanting to pay for admission to the festival. Festival organizers argued that it was the first year in which an accurate method of counting the attendance was employed and that the numbers did not reflect a drop in attendance.

In 2011 the first local pride festival was held in Moab, Utah.

The 2012 festival included performers Frenchie Davis and Prince Poppycock

In 2013, pride spread to Provo, Utah, with their first pride.

In 2014, Mayor Ralph Becker threw a private wedding reception for couples whose marriages he performed on the first day that same-sex marriage became legal in Utah.

Pride reached Ogden, Utah, in 2015 when they held their first pride festival.

2016 was the first year panel discussions were held during the festival, inside the Salt Lake City Public Library.

2020 saw the festival postponed till September due to the COVID-19 pandemic, but ultimately happened in October, with the First Utah Pride Road Ralley.2021 was restructured as a Pride Week, much like early pride festivals of the early 1990s due to the ongoing wake of the COVID-19 pandemic and issues with ensuring proper health for the populous with vaccinated/unvaccinated peoples. Events included walk through exhibits, online inter-faith, and a march starting near the Utah State Capitol building at 300 North State St., marchers carried the 300 foot rainbow flag and the first balloon arch. The flag and balloon arch marched down State Street and met the next balloon arch, and then the next balloon arch, and the next, until all had joined together to create a massive balloon arch of over 1000 balloons, as the march reached Harvey Milk Boulevard and 600 east at Liberty Park.

See also

List of LGBT events
Utah Pride Center

Notes

References
Gay and Lesbian Community Center of Utah records. Accession number (Accn) 1918. Salt Lake City: Special Collections and Archives, J. Willard Marriott Library, University of Utah. 2001; also cataloged at Archives West OCA.

External links
Utah Pride Center

Festivals in Utah
June events
LGBT events in Utah
Pride parades in the United States
Utah culture
Tourist attractions in Salt Lake City
1977 establishments in Utah